Vadim Iosifovich Bogiyev (born 27 December 1970) is a Russian wrestler of Ossetian heritage, who earned the gold medal at the Summer Olympic Games 1996 in men's  Freestyle wrestling, also he is worlds 1993 runner-up. 3x European champion.

Olympics
Bogiyev competed at the 1996 Summer Olympics in Atlanta where he received a gold medal in Freestyle wrestling, the lightweight class.

References

External links
 

1970 births
Living people
Olympic wrestlers of Russia
Wrestlers at the 1996 Summer Olympics
Russian male sport wrestlers
Olympic gold medalists for Russia
Martial artists from Moscow
Olympic medalists in wrestling
Medalists at the 1996 Summer Olympics
20th-century Russian people